Historically, Comoros has had a relatively poor human rights record. In early 1979, Comorian authorities arrested some 300 supporters of the Soilih's regime and imprisoned them without trial in Moroni. Four of Soilih's former ministers also disappeared. For the next two years, there were further arrests, shootings, and disappearances. Under pressure from France, some trials were held but many Comorians remained political prisoners, despite protests from Amnesty International and other humanitarian organizations. The Abdallah regime also restricted freedom of speech, press, association, citizens' rights to change their government, women's rights, and workers' rights. After Abdallah's death on November 27, 1989, the country's human rights record improved. The European mercenaries who ruled the island ordered only a few arrests and released nearly all political prisoners who had been detained after the 1985 and 1987 coup attempts.

This trend continued until March 1990, when Djohar became president of Comoros. Opposition to his regime resulted in questionable human rights practices. For example, after an unsuccessful August 18–19, 1990 coup attempt, the authorities detained twenty-four people without trial in connection with the uprising. In October 1990, the security forces killed Max Veillard, the leader of the conspirators. The following year, after efforts to remove him from the presidency for negligence failed, Djohar ordered the arrest of several Supreme Court judges and declared a state of emergency. Another failed coup attempt on September 26, 1992, prompted the authorities to detain more than twenty people, including former Minister of Interior Omar Tamou. Police held these detainees incommunicado and reportedly tortured some of them. The Comorian Human Rights Association also accused the Djohar regime of extrajudicially executing individuals suspected of supporting armed opposition groups. By late 1993, groups such as Amnesty International continued to monitor the human rights situation in Comoros, and to speak out against the Djohar regime.

Historical situation
The following chart shows Comoros's ratings since 1975 in the Freedom in the World reports, published annually by Freedom House. A rating of 1 is "free"; 7, "not free".

International treaties
Comoros's stances on international human rights treaties are as follows:

See also 

Freedom of religion in Comoros
LGBT rights in Comoros
Politics of Comoros

Notes 
1.Note that the "Year" signifies the "Year covered". Therefore the information for the year marked 2008 is from the report published in 2009, and so on.
2.As of 6 July (Independence Day) in 1975; 1 January thereafter.
3.The 1982 report covers the year 1981 and the first half of 1982, and the following 1984 report covers the second half of 1982 and the whole of 1983. In the interest of simplicity, these two aberrant "year and a half" reports have been split into three year-long reports through interpolation.

References
 or

External links
 Freedom in the World 2012 Report, by Freedom House